I Am All Girls is a 2021 South African mystery thriller film directed by Donovan Marsh and written by Wayne Fitzjohn and Marcell Greeff. It is based on true events but also contains fictionalised elements. Starring Erica Wessels, Hlubi Mboya and Masasa Mbangeni, the film follows detective Jodie Snyman and her colleague Ntombizonke Bapai as they race to track down members of an apartheid-era sex-trafficking syndicate who are being murdered one by one by an unknown serial killer.

Upon its release on 14 May 2021, I Am All Girls was watched by Netflix subscribers all over the world, at one point ranking among the world's Top 10 films on Netflix.

Cast
 Erica Wessels as Jodie Snyman
 Hlubi Mboya as Ntombizonke Bapai
Nomvelo Makhanya as teenage Ntombizonke
Leshego Molokwane as young Ntombizonke
 Deon Lotz as FJ Nolte
 Mothusi Magano as Captain George Mululeki
 Brendon Daniels as Investigating Officer Samuel Arendse
 J.P. du Plessis : Gert de Jager
 Lizz Meiring as Gert's girlfriend
 Rafiq Jajbhay as Iranian boss
 Masasa Mbangeni as Thamsanqa
 Ben Kruger as Oupa Carel Duvenhage
 Tamarin du Toit as Liezel Lourens
 Marcus Mabusela as Coroner
 Cindy Swabepoel as Mrs Lourens
 Israel Matseke Zulu as pimp
 Mampho Brescia as brother boss girl
 Khutjo Green as Agnes
 Jason Fiddler as Khan's shipping official
 Lovie Ramasrai as container yard official
 Afzal Kahn as Salim Khan
 Matt Stern as Salim Khan's lawyer
 Kaseran Pillay as Pharwaz Khan
 Federico Fernandez as young Iranian boss
 Kate Liquorish as airline attendant
 Eduard Horn as Gert's interrogator

Pre-production 
Wayne Fitzjohn, the founder of Nthibah Pictures, first started working on this project about sex-trafficking syndicates because he wanted to shine light on the difficulties South African police services face in fighting against the crime of human trafficking. He also wanted to show that there are "those who are dedicated to helping the victims."

Awards and nominations

References

External links
 
 
 

2021 films
2021 thriller films
2020s mystery thriller films
2020s English-language films
English-language Netflix original films
English-language South African films
South African thriller films
Works about sex trafficking